The 1965–66 snooker season was the series of professional snooker tournaments played between July 1965 and June 1966. The following table outlines the results for the season's events.


Calendar

Notes

References

1965
1965 in snooker
1966 in snooker